"The One Where Dr. Ramoray Dies" is the eighteenth episode of the second season of the television situation comedy Friends and 42nd overall.

Plot 
Joey does an interview with Soap Opera Digest, wherein he claims that he makes up most of his lines on Days of Our Lives. When the writers get wind of this, they kill off Joey's character, Dr. Drake Ramoray, by having him fall to his death down an elevator shaft. Joey is devastated, and his friends rush to his apartment to comfort him as he mulls over losing the greatest opportunity he ever had.

Chandler is having trouble bonding with his new roommate Eddie as he spends most of his time in his room. Phoebe tricks them into spending time drinking beers and talking to each other about their ex-girlfriends. Later, Eddie's ex-girlfriend Tilly stops by the apartment to drop off Eddie's fish tank and meets Chandler briefly before Eddie walks out to greet her. Despite their meeting only being brief, Eddie accuses Chandler of sleeping with Tilly and killing his goldfish, especially since the tank was already empty, and steals Chandler's insoles in retaliation. After comforting Joey, Chandler comes home to find Eddie serving him weird "raisin" cookies and having replaced the goldfish with a goldfish cracker, and then goes to bed, dumbfounded.

After playing at Central Perk while Monica and Richard are on a double date with Rachel and Ross, Phoebe claims that Monica has had sex with many boyfriends, leaving Richard curious about the number. They take the argument back to Monica and Rachel's apartment while Ross and Rachel retreat to Rachel's bedroom. Monica is stunned when Richard says he has only been with two women – her and his ex-wife Barbara – and those two women he has been in love with. Touched, Monica admits she loves him, too. Meanwhile, Ross asks Rachel to list her own sexual conquests, but when she mentions Paolo as meaningless animal sex, Ross gets upset at her. Rachel manages to assuage him by telling him that their own relationship is so much better as they have tenderness and intimacy, and they connect. When Rachel claims he is the best sex she has ever had, Ross promptly decides to up the ante with animal sex of his own.

Monica and Rachel head to the bathroom to celebrate but argue with each other when they find out they have only one condom, while Ross and Richard awkwardly talk to each other in the living room. Rachel gets the condom after she wins a game of rock, paper, scissors against Monica and promptly has animal sex with Ross, forcing Monica and Richard to delay their plans.

On another night, Ross, wearing Rachel's bathrobe, sneaks toward the bathroom to retrieve a condom. Richard then appears from Monica's room with the same objective, while wearing her robe. They have a brief, awkward exchange before agreeing never to speak of it.

Reception 
This episode forms the basis of a study published in Pediatrics on "the impact of condom-efficacy messages in an episode of Friends on teens". During a discussion about v-chips, Connecticut senator Joseph Lieberman told series co-creator Marta Kauffman that he was appalled by the scene where Monica and Rachel fight over the last condom and turned off his television. Kauffman dismissed Lieberman's comments because he misunderstood the scene; the characters were advocating safe sex by agreeing that whoever did not have the condom could not have sex.

References

External links 
 

1996 American television episodes
Friends (season 2) episodes

fi:Frendit (2. tuotantokausi)#Tohtori Ramoray kuolee